Probable RNA-binding protein 19 is a protein that in humans is encoded by the RBM19 gene.

References

Further reading